The Baptismal font of Prince Višeslav is a baptismal font of the historical and cultural significance for Croats. Its inscription mentions for the first time a Croatian ruler, Prince Višeslav. The original place of the baptismal font was in the Baptistery (Chapel of  Saint John the Baptist) near the Cathedral of Nin, the first residence city of Croatian-Dalmatian rulers.

The baptismal font was most likely created after the establishment  (ca. 864–867) of Nin Diocese, but no later than the end of 10th century AD, i.e. during the period of Christianization of the Croats. Croatian historian Ljubo Karaman concluded in his works that "it is not too bold to assume that this very baptismal font was used for the baptism of Croatian rulers". Furthermore, it is considered an important cultural object and an example of application of Croatian interlace.

History 
From the written report of the notary Ivan Sorari (1773–1847) from Zadar made in 1793, when the ruins of the Nin Baptistery were still visible in situ, as well as from the archaeological excavations in 1910 it is known that the baptistery had a four-leaf floor plan and a dome. In the middle of the baptistery was the baptismal font, to which one had to descend five steps.

In 1742 the baptistery (last used for burials) was demolished and the baptismal font was removed in order to expand the cathedral's sacristy. In 1853 the font was found in Capuchin monastery of Il Redentore in Venice and afterwards exhibited at Museo Correr. In 1942 the Kingdom of Italy gifted the baptismal font to its then political ally, the so-called Independent State of Croatia. From then on and long after the World War II, the font stood in the atrium of the Palace of Croatian Academy of Sciences and Arts in the state's capital, Zagreb. Today the font can be seen in the harbor city of Split, in the Museum of Croatian Archaeological Monuments.

Form and measurements 
The baptismal font was cut from a single marble block in the form of hexagon. In one of the side faces, there is an irregular opening (now closed), which was probable used to supply water to the font. The bottom has a round opening for water outflow. There are a few holes at the rim of the top opening that contain iron scraps. Possibly these are the remains of a fastening for a lid or a railing. They probably do not come from the time the font was created.

Decoration 
Each of the six sides, except the bottom one, is decorated on the left and on the right with tilted furrows, like a relief column wrapped in a cord with a simple base and a capital with two side volutes. These pillars have a simply profiled architrave, decorated only with plain molding.

On the front central side there is a relief cross styled like a processional cross. The top and both side arms of the cross each have two volutes, but the bottom arm does not. The body of the cross arms is filled with Croatian interlace. The bottom, longer arm of the cross stands on a leg, also filled with tilted furrows, as if wrapped in a cord, which tapers off.

Inscriptions 
The architrave, which also forms the hem of the opening, has the Latin inscription:
 + HEC FONS NEMPE SVMIT INFIRMOS VT REDDATILLVMINATOS · HIC EXPIANT SCELERA SVA QVODDE PRIMO SVMPSERVNT PARENTE · VT EFFICIANTVR XPISTICOLE SALVBRITER CONFITENDO TRINVM PERHENNE · HOC IOHANNES PRESBITER SVB TEMPORE VVISSASCLAVO DVCI OPVS BENE COMPOSVIT DEVOTE

On the fifth side of the font, i.e. under the fifth line of the above, one can read:
 IN HONORE VIDELICET SANCTI

The six side bears the end of the inscription with two lines:
 IOHANNIS BAPTISTE, VT INTERCEDAT PRO EOCLIENTVLOQVE SVO

The stonemason used many ligatures, contractions, suspensions, and abbreviation characters for TRINVM ("Trinity") and special characters for word part PER in the word PERHENNE ("eternal").

The inscription can be translated as follows:

 This source receives the weak in order to return them as enlightened ones. Here they atone for the sins, passed upon them from the first father, so that they become followers of Christ, salutary testifying to the eternal Trinity. This work was beautifully made in humility by the priest John in the time of Prince Višeslav, in honor of St. John the Baptist, so that he could become his and his protégés' advocate.

The Catholic Church in Croatia considers the inscription to be a "shiny monument and symbol of the baptism of our Croatian ancestors".

Literature

References 

Christianity in Croatia
Culture in Split, Croatia
Archaeological discoveries in Croatia
Prince Višeslav
National symbols of Croatia